Patricia van Dalen (born in 1955 in Venezuela, with Dutch roots), is a Miami based visual artist, with a career that spans over thirty five years, dedicated to abstract painting, ephemeral site-specific installations, and designing permanent works for public places and private architectural spaces.

Early life 
Patricia van Dalen was born in Maracaibo, in western Venezuela. With a Dutch father and a Venezuelan mother, she lived her first years in Maracaibo and then moved with her family to Holland. In 1962, moves back to Venezuela, to live in Caracas. In 1980 she moves to Paris until 1983; and then back to Caracas, and now she is based in Miami.  Van Dalen graduated from high school in 1970, and went on to study in the Neumann Institute Of Design (Instituto de Diseño Fundación Neumann-INCE), in Caracas, where she graduated in 1977 as a graphic designer. Intermittently between 1980 and 1986, she trained and lived in Paris, while she worked with the kinetic artist Yaacov Agam in the Visual Education Method for pre-school children. Most of her artistic career was developed in Caracas, Venezuela, where she is recognized as a preeminent artist. Van Dalen currently resides and works in Miami, FL, US.

Career 
Patricia Van Dalen taught in the Design Institute Foundation, and at the Architecture School of the Central University of Venezuela, among other institutions; and frequently conducts color and visual workshops in Miami. 

Van Dalen´s work has been exhibited since 1978; she has been part of a great variety of individual and collective exhibitions, both in Venezuela and around the world and her paintings are spread in both public and private collections. In 2011 Van Dalen earned the 2010 Established Artist AICA Award, from the International Association of Art Critics / Venezuela Chapter. Van Dalen's work has contributed to mural art and artistic interventions in public spaces, like the 1,200 sq f Mural Jardín Lumínico in the Prados del Este Highway, and Mural Pajaritos, both in Caracas; and, the main plaza floor Jardín de Calas, Río Caribe, a village in eastern Venezuela. Van Dalen also has an extensive body of work in private residences in Venezuela and the US, where she has intervened on walls, ceilings, rooftops, pool areas, and floors, as part of the interior and landscape design of these places. Her interest in the social dimension of artistic production has led her to frequently incorporating installations and other kinds of ephemeral works, into public spaces. Examples of this are the large-scale site-specific installation Luminous Gardens, at the Fairchild Tropical Garden in 2003 (the program Art at Fairchild, held by the Fairchild Tropical Botanic Garden started with this striking installation, Luminous Gardens); and Fragmented Light, an ephemeral intervention of the stairway walls of the Miller Learning Center, at the University of Georgia, in Athens, GA. Her work has been collected by institutions such as the Museum of Latin American Art, MoLAA, Los Angeles, CA, US; Fairchild Tropical Botanic Garden, Coral Gables, FL, US; and, in Caracas, Venezuela, the Museo de Bellas Artes, Galería de Arte Nacional, Museo de Arte Contemporáneo, among others.

In Miami, Van Dalen took up photography in order to develop unusual bodies of work that she displayed in two solo shows: in December 2013, "High Voltage", and in 2017, "Ride the Rail", both in ArtMedia Gallery, Wynwood. The explorations with this medium that Van Dalen employed in her studies in the '70s, has led her to find new ways to link up with her previous productions, unfolding new artistic configurations that are distinct from the former. 

In 2014, Van Dalen created by a commission the Data Hall, a permanent site-specific installation for the University of Miami Institute for Data Science
and Computing. The mural consists of a set of motherboards, which originally formed a part of UM’s first supercomputer, named Pegasus. The boards were altered with plastic lacings that criss-cross and converge into nodes in a scale-free network. These drawings not only communicate Van Dalen's interest in new ways of making art by combining aesthetically compatible materials and thereby producing paradoxical images; they also aid her in the attempts to comprehend the concept of data processing in a tactile and visual manner.

After leading a versatile career, Van Dalen is currently working on different projects: lacquered wood assemblies, aluminum collage, stapled painted papers, paintings on canvas, collages on paper, photographic installations, rug designs, murals for buildings, among others. Since 1983 she has been conducting workshops and courses on the dynamics of visual language, in different variations: in the past teaching Color level I and II at the Design Institute Foundation, and Color workshops in museums and other cultural centers in Caracas; and in 2019 and 2020, art workshops at Miami Dade College as a Special Guest Artist. Currently, Van Dalen teaches visual culture through Zoom's virtual workshops on the dynamics of visual language.

References

Further reading

External links

Patricia van Dalen's Web site
http://everitas.univmiami.net/2014/08/21/reboot-artist-transforms-tech-into-art/
https://ccs.miami.edu/6412/
http://www.artmedia.gallery/artists/artist/news/patricia-van-dalen/

1955 births
Living people
People from Maracaibo
Venezuelan painters
Venezuelan women educators